The Zambian grass lizard or Zambian snake lizard (Chamaesaura miopropus) is a species of lizard which is found in Tanzania, Zambia, Angola, and Democratic Republic of the Congo.

References

miopropus
Reptiles of Angola
Reptiles of the Democratic Republic of the Congo
Reptiles of Tanzania
Reptiles of Zambia
Reptiles described in 1895
Taxa named by George Albert Boulenger